Sheffield Park may refer to:

United Kingdom

Sheffield
 Sheffield Park (UK Parliament constituency), a Parliamentary constituency in the City of Sheffield, England
 Sheffield Park Academy, a secondary school in Sheffield, South Yorkshire, England

East Sussex
 Sheffield Park cricket ground, near Uckfield
 Sheffield Park Garden, a garden. Formerly an estate called "Sheffield Park" when Earl of Sheffield lived there
 Sheffield Park railway station, the southern terminus of the Bluebell Railway

Elsewhere
 Sheffield Park (Charlotte, North Carolina), a park in Charlotte, North Carolina, US